The 1966 Critérium du Dauphiné Libéré was the 20th edition of the cycle race and was held from 4 June to 11 June 1966. The race started in Évian and finished at Grenoble. The race was won by Raymond Poulidor of the Mercier team.

General classification

References

1966
1966 in French sport
1966 Super Prestige Pernod
June 1966 sports events in Europe